Marie Anne Tuck (5 September 1866 – 3 September 1947), was an artist and art educator in South Australia.

History
Marie Tuck was born at Mount Torrens, South Australia, one of eight children of Edward Starkey Tuck (13 March 1827 – 9 August 1898) and his wife Amy Harriet Tuck, née Tayler (29 April 1827 – 13 January 1901), on 5 September 1866, though she later claimed 1872 as her birth year. Her father was a schoolteacher at Mount Torrens.

From 1886 she received arts training at night classes with James Ashton at his Norwood studio, then in the late 1880s at his Adelaide Academy of Arts, working at a Payneham plant nursery and assisting Ashton as a way of paying for her tuition while saving for her big ambition – to study in Paris. She was an early member of the Adelaide Easel Club, In 1896 she moved to Perth, Western Australia, where she gave private tuition and worked at a photographer's studio, perhaps as a photo colorist.

It took ten years, but in 1906, by then Principal of the Perth Art School, she sailed by the Runic to Paris, and there studied under expatriate Australian Rupert Bunny, developing a great love of French people and culture. She exhibited at the "Old Salon" (salon of the Société des Artistes Français), receiving an honorable mention for her painting Toilette for the Bride. She returned to Australia in 1914, departing from Liverpool on 27 June on the 'Medic' a White Star line Steamship, bound for the Cape and Australia. On 3 August Germany declared war on her beloved France. Arriving back in Adelaide on 7 August 1914, she declared that if she had known about the outbreak of war, she would have stayed in France.

After her 1914 arrival back in South Australia, she exhibited in Adelaide and rejoined the local artistic community. She started teaching at the South Australian School of Arts and Crafts.

She held many exhibitions of her own work in Adelaide; impressionistic landscapes, figures and portraits in oils.

Her many students included Ivor Hele, Dora Cecil Chapman and Noel Wood.

She never married; her last address was Jane Street, Frewville, where she had her studio in the front room.

Ruth Tuck (1914–2008), water colorist and art teacher who married fellow-painter Mervyn Ashmore Smith OAM (1904–1994), and who founded her own art school in Burnside in 1955, was a first cousin, once removed, although the relationship was more like aunt and niece.

Significant works
Breton woman is held by the Art Gallery of S.A
Onkaparinga Woollen Mill is held by the Art Gallery of S.A
La Poissonnerie (The Fish Market), a huge canvas, was acquired by the Art Gallery in 1908.

Family
Henry Tuck (1781–1861) was married to Jane Tuck, née Starkey, (1783–1854), lived in Chelsea, London. Children who emigrated to Australia included:
Rev. Henry Lewer Tuck (11 September 1820 – 26 August 1880) married Harriet Caroline Hodson (c. 1830 – 30 June 1909) on 3 October 1850, lived at Stockport, South Australia, was first president of the Baptist Union of South Australia.
eldest son Arthur Edward Tuck (1855 – 8 April 1925), married Minnie Wallis on 7 March 1911, lived at Cowell, South Australia
Ruth Edith Tuck (22 July 1914 – 10 October 2008), married Mervyn Ashmore Smith OAM (11 December 1904 – 18 March 1994) on 15 October 1943; both were modernist watercolorists. They had a son Mark in 1945 and twin daughters Michele and Angelina in 1953.
sixth daughter Bertha Starkey Tuck (1868–1933) was for 40 years a Baptist missionary in India
Elizabeth Tuck (– 13 October 1883)
Harriet Tuck (c. 1819 – 26 June 1887)
Sophia Tuck (c. 1823 – 30 November 1906) of Kenton Valley, South Australia
Edward Starkey Tuck (13 March 1827 – 9 August 1898) married Amy Harriet Tayler (c. 1827 – 13 January 1901)

Amy Jane Tayler Tuck (December 1849 – 4 October 1933) married George Edward Masters (–1912) in 1870
Edward John Tayler Tuck (1853 – 10 June 1926) married Mary Ann "Annie" Tobell (– 11 August 1926) in 1875. He was a minister of religion in Broken Hill.
Sophia Mary Tuck (1855–1943) Head Teacher Mt Torrens School (1877–1912) who undertook her teacher training in the first intake at Adelaide Teachers' College 1876.
Bernard Henry Tuck (1858–1942) married Emma Jane Masters (–1922) on 28 September 1882, lived Forestville, South Australia
Alfred Robert Tuck (1860–1938) married Elizabeth Roach (–1962) on 6 September 1888
Henry Joseph "Harry" Tuck (15 May 1863 – 15 August 1946) married Eliza Playford (9 February 1866–1941) on 1 January 1889. Eliza was the second daughter of Hon. Thomas Playford
Marie Anne Tuck (5 September 1866 – 3 September 1947)
Elizabeth Frances Starkey "Francie" Tuck (1869 – 1 September 1946) trained as a school teacher, and had a career as a teacher of singing and piano. She had a short period in Europe, studying music and traveling. She also studied Art and acted as her sister, Marie's press agent, during the time that Marie Tuck was living in France.

References 

Australian painters
Australian women painters
Australian art teachers
1866 births
1947 deaths
19th-century Australian women
20th-century Australian women